Maggie LaGue is an American ice hockey defender, currently playing with the Connecticut Whale in the Premier Hockey Federation (PHF).

Career   
Across 141 games with Robert Morris University, LaGue scored 92 points, the university all-time record for points by a defender. She would serve as team captain in her final season, winning the CHA Individual Sportsmanship Award.

She was drafted 22nd overall by the Connecticut Whale in the 2018 NWHL Draft, the second player in Robert Morris history to be drafted. She would spend the 2019–20 season with the PWHPA, before signing with the Whale in May 2020.

Career Statistics

External links

References 

1997 births
Living people
Connecticut Whale (PHF) players
Professional Women's Hockey Players Association players
People from Barre, Vermont
Ice hockey people from Vermont